Dunans Castle is an historic structure located in Glendaruel, on the Cowal peninsula, Argyll and Bute, Scotland. The property is owned by Charles and Sadie Dixon-Spain.  A property at Dounens was shown on maps in 1590; Dunans House was elaborated into its present mock castle form in 1864. Once part of a much larger estate the property presently includes  of ground and in 2001 was ruined by fire.

History

For over two centuries Dunans was home to the Fletcher Clan who moved to the site between 1715 and 1745 carrying with them the door of their previous home at Achallader Castle (the door was used for the private chapel and was reported missing in 1999). The original mansion-style house (to the left in the picture) was extended into its present dramatic Franco-baronial "castle" form by the architect Andrew Kerr with the additions consisting of four main apartments and 6 bedrooms. The building passed out of Fletcher hands in 1997 when the entire 3000 acre Dunans estate was sold off by Colonel Archibald Fletcher's heirs and subsequently split up. 
Following a number of financial problems, the Category B listed castle was gutted by fire on 14 January 2001 while being run as a hotel and the building was left as a ruin. The fire began in the attic space of the castle section and destroyed three floors with only the pre Victorian west wing surviving undamaged. The owner Ewa Lucas-Gardener had ignored fire safety experts warnings that the building's fireplaces were unsafe and abandoned the building after the insurers refused to pay out. Now under new ownership, the site, including a Victorian path network, has undergone some restoration supported by the Dunans Charitable Trust.
The castle was reported to have three resident ghosts.

Present day

Dunans Castle Limited, which runs the ScottishLaird.com website, published the Conservation Plan for Dunans in April 2014. Written by conservation architect Robin Kent, the book outlines the programme for the restoration of the castle and the bridge.

The regional blog ForArgyll.com is run from the site as is the Walking Theatre Company. The building remains in the at-risk category of the Buildings at Risk Register and is described as being in very poor condition.

Bridge and mausoleum

Leading to the castle is Dunans Bridge, an A-listed structure, designed by Thomas Telford in 1815 and constructed to commemorate the battle of Waterloo by John Fletcher.

Once part of the Dunans estate, but still in the ownership of the Fletchers is the Fletcher of Dunans Mausoleum, a grade C listed structure located in the gardens of the neighbouring Stronardron house.

Further buildings once part of the estate but now privately owned include Dunans Lodge, the original gate house to the estate and Dunans Cottage, two workers' cottages combined into one dwelling.

Scottish laird fundraiser 

The current owners operate a scheme whereby individuals can be given or can purchase "Laird or Lady packages" which entitle them to "own" a square foot of land in the grounds of Dunans Castle in Scotland and use the decorative title "Laird of Dunans" or "Lady of Dunans". The profits from the sale of these packages are used to restore this private property.

The Court of the Lord Lyon states that “ownership of a souvenir plot of land is not sufficient to bring a person otherwise ineligible within the jurisdiction of the Lord Lyon for seeking a coat of arms”, and indicated if these souvenir plots were being purchased for this purpose then they were as good as meaningless. The Scottish Land Register also does not recognise individual ownership of such small plots, meaning purchase of these titles holds no legal entitlement to ownership of the land nor use of it: they are simply decorative.

Owners

Gallery

References

External links

 Dunans Heritage Project

Category B listed buildings in Argyll and Bute
Listed castles in Scotland
Glendaruel
Kilmodan
Reportedly haunted locations in Scotland
Ruined castles in Argyll and Bute
Clan Fletcher
Mock castles in Scotland
Buildings at Risk Register for Scotland